Michel's Almshouses are Grade II listed almshouses in Richmond, London, located in  The Vineyard, opposite Bishop Duppa's Almshouses and Queen Elizabeth's Almshouses. They were founded in the 1690s by Humphrey Michel. The original ten almshouses were built in 1696 and were rebuilt in 1811. Another six almshouses were added in 1858.

The almshouses are now managed by The Richmond Charities. New residents are accepted from 65 years of age.

See also
List of almshouses in the United Kingdom

Notes and references

External links
The Richmond Charities
The Vineyard, Richmond: History of Michel's Almshouses

1696 establishments in England
Almshouses in Richmond, London
Grade II listed almshouses
History of the London Borough of Richmond upon Thames
Residential buildings completed in 1811
Residential buildings completed in 1858
The Vineyard, Richmond